Nyumba ya Mungu Dam is a Tanzanian,   hydroelectric dam located in and operated in Mwanga District , Kilimanjaro Region. It was built in the late 1960s and is Kilimanjaro region's largest artificial water body. Nyumba ya Mungu Reservoir. The reservoir is shared with Moshi District of Kilimanjaro Region and Simanjiro District of Manyara Region. Nyumba ya Mungu means 'House of God'.

Overview

Reservoir
Nyumba ya Mungu is a man made lake in the Kilimanjaro region. The reservoir is situated in the Pangani River Valley of the Masai Steppe, about 50 km south of Moshi.

It was constructed for the purposes of irrigation, hydro-electric power and to start a local fishing industry. The reservoir was completed in December 1965 however the irrigation scheme had not yet been developed. The plan was to build a dam that would have served the purpose of storing flood flow, which would allow the development of some 30,000 acres of irrigated farming and generation of electricity power.

By 1970 the lake had a thriving Tilapia fishery production. However, this did not last long and subsequent reports from 1972 and 1973 showed a major decline in fish product.

See also

Tanzania Electric Supply Company
List of power stations in Tanzania

References

External links

Dams in Tanzania
Hydroelectric power stations in Tanzania
Pangani basin
Buildings and structures in the Kilimanjaro Region
Important Bird Areas of Tanzania